The  is a group of kofun burial mounds located in the Sakashita neighborhood of the city of Tsuruga, Fukui in the Hokuriku region of Japan. The site was designated a National Historic Site of Japan in 1988.

Overview
These tumuli date from the 4th to 6th century AD and were discovered during the construction of a highway bypass connecting the Hokuriku Expressway with Japan National Route 8, during which time a number of other archaeological discoveries were made, including the Yoshikawa Site, a Yayoi period settlement, and the Kotanigahora Kofun Cluster; however, neither of these sites received government protection and were totally destroyed during highway construction after a hasty compliance excavation. The Nakagō Kofun Cluster itself did not receive full protection, and within the site only Mukaiyama Tombs 1, 3 and 4 and Myōjinyama Tombs 1, 2, 3, 9 and 10 are covered by the National Historic Site designation.

Mukaiyama Tomb 1 was excavated several times starting in 1954, and the two vertical-type burial chambers were opened. Grave goods found include weapons such as swords, spearheads, and fragments of gold-plated armor and helmets, bronze mirrors, and agricultural implements. The weapons in particular are considered to be rare examples nationwide, and have been preserved since 2010 at a private folk museum in Tsuruga.

The tumuli are about 15 minutes by car from Tsuruga Station on the JR West Hokuriku Main Line.

Mukaiyama site
This site consists of three surviving circular-type kofun on a hilltop ridge in the Yoshikawa neighborhood of Tsuruga.  There is an explanatory plaque in front of each tumulus.

Mukaiyama No.1: A large burial mound from the end of the fifth century, diameter 60 meters, height nine meters in two stages, faced with  fukiishi stones. There is also a possibility that it was originally a scallop-shaped tumulus with a total length of 75 meters. There are two pit-type stone chambers at the top of the mound, and a large number of burial items have been excavated. However, the south side is partly missing due to construction work.
Mukaiyama No.2: This was a circular tumulus from the 5th century, possibility older than Mukaiyama No. 1. It was demolished during the construction work of 1983.
Mukaiyama No.3: This is a circular tumulus from the second half of the sixth century, with a diameter of 15 meters, a height of four meters, with a corridor-type stone chamber (total length 7.2 meters, length of the entry room 3.7 meters, width of 2.0 meters, height 2.7 meters).
Mukaiyama No.4: This is a circular tumulus from the second half of the sixth century, diameter eight meters, height two meters, partially collapsed due to overgrowth of trees and plants.

Myōjinyama site
This site consisted of 23 kofun, of which five survive, on a hilltop ridge in the Sakanoshita neighborhood of Tsuruga.  The site does not have any pathways or placards.

 Myōjinyama No.1: Keyhole-shaped tumulus from the 4th century, length 47 meters, height 5.5 meters, faced with fukiishi stones.
 Myōjinyama No.2: Circular tumulus from the 4th century
 Myōjinyama No.3: Keyhole-shaped tumulus from the 4th century, length 53.5 meters, height seven meters
 Myōjinyama No 9: A keyhole-shaped tumulus from the first half of the sixth century, a length of 20 meters, a height of three meters, with a lateral hole type stone chamber
 Myōjinyama No.10: A circular tumulus

See also
List of Historic Sites of Japan (Fukui)

References

External links

 Tsuruga city home page 
Cultural Heritage of Fukui Prefecture 

Kofun
History of Fukui Prefecture
Tsuruga, Fukui
Historic Sites of Japan
Echizen Province